The Burner' is an album by saxophonist Red Holloway recorded in 1963 and released on the Prestige label.

Reception

Allmusic awarded the album 3 stars stating simply "Early date with Holloway and John Patton (or George Butcher) on Hammond organ".

Track listing 
All compositions by Red Holloway except where noted.
 "Monkey Sho' Can Talk" – 3:36  
 "Brethren" – 5:05  
 "Crib Theme" (Ozzie Cadena) – 10:13  
 "The Burner" – 10:36  
 "Miss Judie Mae" – 3:13  
 "Moonlight in Vermont" (John Blackburn, Karl Suessdorf) – 6:00

Recorded at Van Gelder Studio on August 27 (track 6) and October 10 (tracks 1-5), 1963

Personnel 
Red Holloway – tenor saxophone
Paul Serrano (tracks 1-5), Hobart Dotson (track 6) – trumpet
"Big" John Patton (tracks 1-5), George Butcher (track 6) – organ
Eric Gale (tracks 1-5), Charles Lindsay (track 6) – guitar
Leonard Gaskin (tracks 1-5), Thomas Palmer (track 6) – bass
Herbie Lovelle (tracks 1-5), Bobby Durham (track 6) – drums

References 

Red Holloway albums
1963 albums
Prestige Records albums
Albums produced by Ozzie Cadena
Albums recorded at Van Gelder Studio